This is a list of career statistics of American tennis player Coco Gauff since her professional debut in 2018. Gauff has won three WTA Tour singles titles and seven doubles titles, as well as one ITF singles titles and one doubles title.

Performance timelines

Only main-draw results in WTA Tour, Grand Slam tournaments, Fed Cup/Billie Jean King Cup and Olympic Games are included in win–loss records.

Singles
Current through the 2023 Indian Wells Open.

Doubles
Current through the 2023 Indian Wells Open.

Significant finals

Grand Slam tournaments

Singles: 1 (1 runner-up)

Doubles: 2 (2 runner-ups)

WTA 1000 finals

Doubles: 2 (2 titles)

WTA career finals

Singles: 4 (3 titles, 1 runner-up)

Doubles: 10 (7 titles, 3 runner-ups)

ITF Circuit finals

Singles: 1 (1 runner-up)

Doubles: 2 (1 title, 1 runner-up)

ITF Junior Circuit

Junior Grand Slam finals

Singles: 2 (1 title, 1 runner-up)

Doubles: 1 (1 title)

ITF Junior finals

Singles: 5 (3 titles, 2 runner–ups)

Doubles: 2 (2 titles)

WTA Tour career earnings 
Current through the 2022 US Open.

Career Grand Slam statistics

Grand Slam tournament seedings 
The tournaments won by Gauff are in boldface, and advanced into finals by Gauff are in italics.

Singles

Doubles

Best Grand Slam results details 
Grand Slam winners are in boldface, and runner–ups are in italics.

Singles

Record against other players

No. 1 wins

Record against top 10 players

 She has a  record against players who were, at the time the match was played, ranked in the top 10.

Notes

References

External links
 Coco Gauff at the Women's Tennis Association
 Coco Gauff at the International Tennis Federation

Gauff, Coco